"Like an Open Door" is a song written by Sheila Young and performed by The Fuzz. It reached #14 on the U.S. R&B chart and #77 on the Billboard Hot 100 in 1971. The song was featured on their 1971 album, The Fuzz.

The song was produced by Carr-Cee Productions.

References

1971 songs
1971 singles
The Fuzz (band) songs
Calla Records singles